In mathematics, algebroid may refer to several distinct notions, which nevertheless all arise from generalising certain aspects of the theory of algebras or Lie algebras.

Algebroid branch, a formal power series branch of an algebraic curve
Algebroid cohomology
Algebroid multifunction
Courant algebroid, an object generalising Lie bialgebroids
Lie algebroid, the infinitesimal counterpart of Lie groupoids
Atiyah algebroid, a fundamental example of a Lie algebroid associated to a principal bundle
R-algebroid, a categorical construction associated to groupoids

Mathematics disambiguation pages